Rajkishan Patel (born 30 April 1997) is an Indian cricketer. He made his List A debut for Odisha in the 2016–17 Vijay Hazare Trophy on 3 March 2017.

References

External links
 

1997 births
Living people
Indian cricketers
Odisha cricketers
People from Sundergarh district
Cricketers from Odisha